This article is part of the history of rail transport by country series

The history of rail transport in the Central African Republic is limited to a now closed short railway line, and two proposed railway projects that were not implemented.

Zinga–Mongo railway
The only railway line ever to be built on the territory of the present-day Central African Republic ran from Zinga, Lobaye to Mongo. Following Thomas Kautzor, operation ended in 1962, when the construction of a 2.50 m deep channel to allow year-round navigation has finished after 13 years of work.

The Zinga–Mongo railway was constructed to  narrow gauge.

On 11 April 2006, the remnants of the Zinga–Mongo railway were added to the UNESCO World Heritage Tentative List, in the Cultural category.

Proposed Bangui–Port Lamy railway
In the turmoil of the move towards independence, this project was abandoned.

Proposed Kribi–Bangui railway
A line from the port of Kribi in Cameroon to Bangui was proposed in 2002.

See also

History of the Central African Republic
Transport in the Central African Republic

References

External links

This article is based on a translation of the German Wikipedia article Schienenverkehr in der Zentralafrikanischen Republik as at September 2012.

Central African Republic
Rail transport
600 mm gauge railways in the Central African Republic